In linguistics, grammatical gender system is a specific form of noun class system, where nouns are assigned with gender categories that are often not related to their real-world qualities. In languages with grammatical gender, most or all nouns inherently carry one value of the grammatical category called gender; the values present in a given language (of which there are usually two or three) are called the genders of that language.

Whereas some authors use the term "grammatical gender" as a synonym of "noun class", others use different definitions for each; many authors prefer "noun classes" when none of the inflections in a language relate to sex. Gender systems are used in approximately one half of the world's languages. According to one definition: "Genders are classes of nouns reflected in the behaviour of associated words."

Overview 
Languages with grammatical gender usually have two to four different genders, but some are attested with up to 20.

Common gender divisions include masculine and feminine; masculine, feminine, and neuter; or animate and inanimate.

Depending on the language and the word, this assignment might bear some relationship with the meaning of the noun (e.g. "woman" is usually feminine), or may be arbitrary.

In a few languages, the assignment of any particular noun (i.e., nominal lexeme, that set of noun forms inflectable from a common lemma) to one grammatical gender is solely determined by that noun’s meaning (or attributes, like biological sex, humanness, or animacy). However, the existence of words that denote male and female, such as the difference between "aunt" and "uncle" is not enough to constitute a gender system.

In other languages, the division into genders usually correlates to some degree, at least for a certain set of nouns (such as those denoting humans), with some property or properties of the things that particular nouns denote. Such properties include animacy or inanimacy, "humanness" or non-humanness, and biological sex.

However, in most languages, this semantic division is only partially valid, and many nouns may belong to a gender category that contrasts with their meaning (e.g. the word for "manliness" could be of feminine gender, as it is in French with "masculinité" and "virilité"). In such a case, the gender assignment can also be influenced by the morphology or phonology of the noun, or in some cases can be apparently arbitrary.

Usually each noun is assigned to one of the genders, and few or no nouns can occur in more than one gender.

Gender is considered an inherent quality of nouns, and it affects the forms of other related words, a process called "agreement". Nouns may be considered the "triggers" of the process, whereas other words will be the "target" of these changes.

These related words can be, depending on the language: determiners, pronouns, numerals, quantifiers, possessives, adjectives, past and passive participles, articles, verbs, adverbs, complementizers, and adpositions. Gender class may be marked on the noun itself, but will also always be marked on other constituents in a noun phrase or sentence. If the noun is explicitly marked, both trigger and target may feature similar alternations.

Functions of grammatical gender 
Three possible functions of grammatical gender include:
 In a language with explicit inflections for gender, it is easy to express gender distinctions in animate beings.
 Grammatical gender "can be a valuable tool of disambiguation", rendering clarity about antecedents or homophones.
 In literature, gender can be used to "animate and personify inanimate nouns".

Among these, role 2 is probably the most important in everyday usage. Languages with gender distinction generally have fewer cases of ambiguity concerning, for example, pronominal reference. In the English phrase "a flowerbed in the garden which I maintain", only context tells us whether the relative clause (which I maintain) refers to the whole garden or just the flowerbed. In German, gender distinction prevents such ambiguity. The word for "flowerbed" is neuter, whereas that for "garden" is masculine. Hence, if a neuter relative pronoun is used, the relative clause refers to "flowerbed", and if a masculine pronoun is used, the relative clause refers to "garden". Because of this, languages with gender distinction can often use pronouns where in English a noun would have to be repeated in order to avoid confusion. It does not, however, help in cases where the words are of the same grammatical gender.

Moreover, grammatical gender may serve to distinguish homophones. It is a quite common phenomenon in language development for two phonemes to merge, thereby making etymologically distinct words sound alike. In languages with gender distinction, however, these word pairs may still be distinguishable by their gender.

Gender contrasts 

Common systems of gender contrast include:
 masculine–feminine gender contrast
 masculine–feminine–neuter gender contrast
 animate–inanimate gender contrast
 common–neuter gender contrast

Masculine–feminine contrast 
Nouns that denote specifically male persons (or animals) are normally of masculine gender; those that denote specifically female persons (or animals) are normally of feminine gender; and nouns that denote something that does not have any sex, or do not specify the sex of their referent, have come to belong to one or other of the genders, in a way that may appear arbitrary. Examples of languages with such a system include most of the modern Romance languages, the Baltic languages, the Celtic languages, some Indo-Aryan languages (e.g., Hindi), and the Afroasiatic languages.

Masculine–feminine–neuter contrast 
This is similar to systems with a masculine–feminine contrast, except that there is a third available gender, so nouns with sexless or unspecified-sex referents may be either masculine, feminine, or neuter. There are also certain exceptional nouns whose gender does not follow the denoted sex, such as the German , meaning "girl", which is neuter. This is because it is actually a diminutive of "Magd" and all diminutive forms with the suffix  are neuter. Examples of languages with such a system include later forms of Proto-Indo-European (see below), Sanskrit, some Germanic languages, most Slavic languages, a few Romance languages (Romanian, Asturian and Neapolitan), Marathi, Latin, and Greek.

Animate–inanimate contrast 
Here nouns that denote animate things (humans and animals) generally belong to one gender, and those that denote inanimate things to another (although there may be some deviation from that principle). Examples include earlier forms of Proto-Indo-European and the earliest family known to have split off from it, the extinct Anatolian languages (see below). Modern examples include Algonquian languages such as Ojibwe.
 In Northern Kurdish language (Kurmanji), the same word can have two genders according to the context. For example, if the word  (meaning 'wood' or 'tree') is feminine, it means that it is a living tree (e.g.,  means 'apple tree'), but if it is masculine, it means that it is dead, no longer living (e.g.,  means 'apple wood'). So if one wants to refer to a certain table that is made of wood from an apple tree, one cannot use the word  with a feminine gender, and if one wants to refer to an apple tree in a garden, one cannot use  with a masculine gender.

Common–neuter contrast 
Here a masculine–feminine–neuter system previously existed, but the distinction between masculine and feminine genders has been lost in nouns (they have merged into what is called common gender), though not in pronouns that can operate under natural gender. Thus nouns denoting people are usually of common gender, whereas other nouns may be of either gender. Examples include Danish and Swedish (see Gender in Danish and Swedish), and to some extent Dutch (see Gender in Dutch grammar). The dialect of the old Norwegian capital Bergen also uses common gender and neuter exclusively. The common gender in Bergen and in Danish is inflected with the same articles and suffixes as the masculine gender in Norwegian Bokmål. This makes some obviously feminine noun phrases like "a cute girl", "the well milking cow" or "the pregnant mares" sound strange to most Norwegian ears when spoken by Danes and people from Bergen since they are inflected in a way that sounds like the masculine declensions in South-Eastern Norwegian dialects. The same does not apply to Swedish common gender, as the declensions follow a different pattern from both the Norwegian written languages. Norwegian Nynorsk, Norwegian Bokmål and most spoken dialects retain masculine, feminine and neuter even if their Scandinavian neighbours have lost one of the genders. As shown, the merger of masculine and feminine in these languages and dialects can be considered a reversal of the original split in Proto-Indo-European (see below).

Other types of division or subdivision of gender 
Some gender contrasts are referred to as classes; for some examples, see Noun class. In some of the Slavic languages, for example, within the masculine and sometimes feminine and neuter genders, there is a further division between animate and inanimate nouns—and in Polish, also sometimes between nouns denoting humans and non-humans. (For details, see below.) A human–non-human (or "rational–non-rational") distinction is also found in Dravidian languages. (See below.)

How gender contrasts can influence cognition 
Grammatical gender does not appear to constrain thought. However, they do slightly impact the way we think: for instance, it has been consistently shown that gender causes a number of cognitive effects. For example, when native speakers of gendered languages are asked to imagine an inanimate object speaking, whether its voice is male or female tends to correspond to the grammatical gender of the object in their language. This has been observed for speakers of Spanish, French, and German, among others.

Caveats of this research include the possibility of subjects' "using grammatical gender as a strategy for performing the task", and the fact that even for inanimate objects the gender of nouns is not always random. For example, in Spanish, female gender is often attributed to objects that are "used by women, natural, round, or light" and male gender to objects "used by men, artificial, angular, or heavy." Apparent failures to reproduce the effect for German speakers has also led to a proposal that the effect is restricted to languages with a two-gender system, possibly because such languages are inclined towards a greater correspondence between grammatical and natural gender.

Another kind of test asks people to describe a noun, and attempts to measure whether it takes on gender-specific connotations depending on the speaker's native language. For example, one study found that German speakers describing a bridge more often used the words 'beautiful', 'elegant', 'pretty', and 'slender', while Spanish speakers, whose word for bridge is masculine, used 'big', 'dangerous', 'strong', and 'sturdy' more often. However, studies of this kind have been criticised on various grounds and yield an unclear pattern of results overall.

Related linguistic concepts

Noun classes 

A noun may belong to a given class because of characteristic features of its referent, such as sex, animacy, shape, although in some instances a noun can be placed in a particular class based purely on its grammatical behavior. Some authors use the term "grammatical gender" as a synonym of "noun class", but others use different definitions for each.

Many authors prefer "noun classes" when none of the inflections in a language relate to sex, such as when an animate–inanimate distinction is made. Note, however, that the word "gender" derives from Latin  (also the root of genre) which originally meant "kind", so it does not necessarily have a sexual meaning.

Noun classifiers 

A classifier, or measure word, is a word or morpheme used in some languages together with a noun, principally to enable numbers and certain other determiners to be applied to the noun. They are not regularly used in English or other European languages, although they parallel the use of words such as piece(s) and head in phrases like "three pieces of paper" or "thirty head of cattle". They are a prominent feature of East Asian languages, where it is common for all nouns to require a classifier when being quantified—for example, the equivalent of "three people" is often "three classifier people". A more general type of classifier (classifier handshapes) can be found in sign languages.

Classifiers can be considered similar to genders or noun classes, in that a language which uses classifiers normally has a number of different ones, used with different sets of nouns. These sets depend largely on properties of the things that the nouns denote (for example, a particular classifier may be used for long thin objects, another for flat objects, another for people, another for abstracts, etc.), although sometimes a noun is associated with a particular classifier more by convention than for any obvious reason. However it is also possible for a given noun to be usable with any of several classifiers; for example, the Mandarin Chinese classifier   is frequently used as an alternative to various more specific classifiers.

The manifestation of grammatical gender 
Grammatical gender can be realized as inflection and can be conditioned by other types of inflection, especially number inflection, where the singular-plural contrast can interact with gender inflection.

Grammatical gender can be realized as inflection 
The grammatical gender of a noun manifests itself in two principal ways: in the modifications that the noun itself undergoes, and in modifications of other related words (agreement).

Grammatical gender as noun inflection 
Grammatical gender manifests itself when words related to a noun like determiners, pronouns or adjectives change their form (inflect) according to the gender of noun they refer to (agreement). The parts of speech affected by gender agreement, the circumstances in which it occurs, and the way words are marked for gender vary between languages. Gender inflection may interact with other grammatical categories like number or case. In some languages the declension pattern followed by the noun itself will be different for different genders.

The gender of a noun may affect the modifications that the noun itself undergoes, particularly the way in which the noun inflects for number and case. For example, a language like Latin, German or Russian has a number of different declension patterns, and which pattern a particular noun follows may be highly correlated with its gender. For some instances of this, see Latin declension.

Gender is sometimes reflected in other ways. In Welsh, gender marking is mostly lost on nouns; however, Welsh has initial mutation, where the first consonant of a word changes into another in certain conditions. Gender is one of the factors that can cause one form of mutation (soft mutation). For instance, the word  "girl" changes into ferch after the definite article. This only occurs with feminine singular nouns:  "son" remains unchanged. Adjectives are affected by gender in a similar way.

Additionally, in many languages, gender is often closely correlated with the basic unmodified form (lemma) of the noun, and sometimes a noun can be modified to produce (for example) masculine and feminine words of similar meaning. See , below.

Grammatical gender as agreement or concord 
Agreement, or concord, is a grammatical process in which certain words change their form so that values of certain grammatical categories match those of related words. Gender is one of the categories which frequently require agreement. In this case, nouns may be considered the "triggers" of the process, because they have an inherent gender, whereas related words that change their form to match the gender of the noun can be considered the "target" of these changes.

These related words can be, depending on the language: determiners, pronouns, numerals, quantifiers, possessives, adjectives, past and passive participles, verbs, adverbs, complementizers, and adpositions. Gender class may be marked on the noun itself, but can also be marked on other constituents in a noun phrase or sentence. If the noun is explicitly marked, both trigger and target may feature similar alternations.

As an example, we consider Spanish, a language with two gender categories: "natural" vs "grammatical". "Natural" gender can be masculine or feminine,  while "grammatical" gender can be masculine, feminine, or neuter. Natural gender refers to the biological sex of most animals and people, while grammatical gender refers to certain phonetic characteristics (the sounds at the end, or beginning) of a noun. Among other lexical items, the definite article changes its form according to this categorization. Thus, in "natural gender", nouns referring to sexed beings who are male beings carry the masculine article, and female beings the feminine article (agreement).

Gender inflection and number inflection 
In some languages the gender is distinguished only in singular number but not in plural. In terms of linguistic markedness, these languages neutralize the gender opposition in the plural, itself a marked category. As a consequence pluralia tantum nouns (lacking a singular form) cannot be assigned a gender. Example with Bulgarian:  ("pincers"),  ("pants"),  ("spectacles"),  ("gills"). 

Other languages,  Serbo-Croatian, allow doubly marked forms both for number and gender. In these languages, each noun has a definite gender no matter the number. For example,  "children" is feminine singularia tantum and  "door" is neuter pluralia tantum.

Grammatical gender can be realized on pronouns 
Pronouns may agree in gender with the noun or noun phrase to which they refer (their antecedent). Sometimes, however, there is no antecedent—the referent of the pronoun is deduced indirectly from the context: this is found with personal pronouns, as well as with indefinite and dummy pronouns.

Personal pronouns 
With personal pronouns, the gender of the pronoun is likely to agree with the natural gender of the referent. Indeed, in most European languages, personal pronouns are gendered; for example English (the personal pronouns he, she and it are used depending on whether the referent is male, female, or inanimate or non-human; this is in spite of the fact that English does not generally have grammatical gender). A parallel example is provided by the object suffixes of verbs in Arabic, which correspond to object pronouns, and which also inflect for gender in the second person (though not in the first):
 "I love you", said to a male: 
 "I love you", said to a female: 

Not all languages have gendered pronouns. These languages might only have different pronouns and inflections in the third person to differentiate between people and inanimate objects, but even this distinction is often absent.

For more on these different types of pronoun, see Third-person pronoun. Issues may arise in languages with gender-specific pronouns in cases when the gender of the referent is unknown or not specified; this is discussed under Gender-neutral language, and in relation to English at Singular they.

In some cases the gender of a pronoun is not marked in the form of the pronoun itself, but is marked on other words by way of agreement.

In null-subject languages (and in some elliptical expressions in other languages), such agreement may take place even though the pronoun does not in fact appear. For example, in Portuguese:
 "[I am] very grateful", said by a male: 
 the same, said by a female: 
The two sentences above mean literally "much obliged"; the adjective agrees with the natural gender of the speaker, that is, with the gender of the first person pronoun which does not appear explicitly here.

Indefinite and dummy pronouns 
A dummy pronoun is a type of pronoun used when a particular verb argument (such as the subject) is nonexistent, but when a reference to the argument is nevertheless syntactically required. They occur mostly in non-pro-drop languages, such as English (because in pro-drop languages the position of the argument can be left empty). Examples in English are the uses of it in "It's raining" and "It's nice to relax."

When a language has gendered pronouns, the use of a particular word as a dummy pronoun may involve the selection of a particular gender, even though there is no noun to agree with. In languages with a neuter gender, a neuter pronoun is usually used, as in German  ("it rains, it's raining"), where  is the neuter third person singular pronoun. (English behaves similarly, because the word it comes from the Old English neuter gender.)

A similar, apparently arbitrary gender assignment may need to be made in the case of indefinite pronouns, where the referent is generally unknown. In this case the question is usually not which pronoun to use, but which gender to assign a given pronoun to (for such purposes as adjective agreement).

Grammatical vs. natural gender  
The natural gender of a noun, pronoun or noun phrase is a gender to which it would be expected to belong based on relevant attributes of its referent. Although grammatical gender can coincide with natural gender, it need not.

Grammatical gender can match natural gender 
This usually means masculine or feminine, depending on the referent's sex. For example, in Spanish,  ("woman") is feminine whereas  ("man") is masculine; these attributions occur solely due to the semantically inherent gender character of each noun.

Grammatical gender need not match natural gender 
The grammatical gender of a noun does not always coincide with its natural gender.

Other examples include:
 Polish  (masculine), meaning "unpleasant (usually old and ugly) woman"
 Portuguese  (masculine), meaning "voluptuous woman"
 Scottish Gaelic  (masculine), meaning "woman"
 Slovenian  (neuter), meaning "girl"
Normally, such exceptions are a small minority.

When a noun with conflicting natural and grammatical gender is the antecedent of a pronoun, it may not be clear which gender of pronoun to choose. There is a certain tendency to keep the grammatical gender when a close back-reference is made, but to switch to natural gender when the reference is further away. For example, in German, the sentences "The girl has come home from school. She is now doing her homework" can be translated in two ways:
 
 
Though the second sentence may appear grammatically incorrect (constructio ad sensum), it is common in speech. With one or more intervening sentences, the second form becomes even more likely. However, a switch to the natural gender is never possible with articles and attributive pronouns or adjectives.

This phenomenon is quite popular in Slavic languages: for example Polish  (deprecative "creature") is feminine but can be used to refer to both man (masculine gender), woman (feminine gender), child (neuter gender) or even animate nouns (e.g. a dog being masculine).

Gender contrasts on human versus sentient referents 
In the case of languages which have masculine and feminine genders, the relation between biological sex and grammatical gender tends to be less exact in the case of animals than in the case of people. In Spanish, for instance, a cheetah is always  (masculine) and a zebra is always  (feminine), regardless of their biological sex. In French, a giraffe is always , whereas an elephant is always . Different names for the male and the female of a species are more frequent for common pets or farm animals,  English cow and bull, Spanish  "cow" and  "bull", Russian  "ram" and  "ewe".

As regards the pronouns used to refer to animals, these generally agree in gender with the nouns denoting those animals, rather than the animals' sex (natural gender). In a language like English, which does not assign grammatical gender to nouns, the pronoun used for referring to objects (it) is often used for animals also. However, if the sex of the animal is known, and particularly in the case of companion animals, the gendered pronouns (he and she) may be used as they would be for a human.

When the sex of an animal is known, it will normally be referred to using gendered pronouns consistent with its sex; otherwise the pronouns will correspond to the gender of the noun denoting its species.

Syntactic structure of grammatical gender 
There are multiple theoretical approaches to the position and structure of gender in syntactic structures.

Categorization of nouns into genders 

There are three main ways by which natural languages categorize nouns into genders:
 according to their form (morphological)
 according to logical or symbolic similarities in their meaning (semantic)
 according to arbitrary convention (lexical, possibly rooted in the language's history).

In most languages that have grammatical gender, a combination of these three types of criteria is found, although one type may be more prevalent.

Form-based morphological criteria 
In many languages, nouns are assigned to gender largely without any semantic basis—that is, not based on any feature (such as animacy or sex) of the person or thing that a noun represents. In such languages there may be a correlation, to a greater or lesser degree, between gender and the form of a noun (such as the vowel or consonant or syllable with which it ends).

(Nouns that end in some other vowel are assigned a gender either according to etymology, by analogy, or by some other convention.) These rules may override semantics in some cases: for example, the noun / ("member") is always masculine, even when it refers to a girl or a woman, and / ("person") is always feminine, even when it refers to a boy or a man, a kind of form-meaning mismatch. In fact, nouns in Spanish and Portuguese (as in the other Romance languages such as Italian and French) generally follow the gender of the Latin words from which they are derived. But the opposite is correct with Northern Kurdish language or Kurmanci.
  (His daughter is my friend)
  (His son is my friend)

Suffixes often carry a specific gender. Similarly, the suffix , which makes countable nouns from uncountable nouns ( "dough" →  "piece of dough"), or personal nouns from abstract nouns ( "teaching",  "punishment" →  "apprentice",  "convict") or adjectives ( "cowardly" →  "coward"), always produces masculine nouns.

However, many masculine nouns have a "broken" plural form ending in a tāʾ marbūṭa; for example   ("male professor") has the plural  , which might be confused for a feminine singular noun. Gender may also be predictable from the type of derivation: for instance, the verbal nouns of Stem II (e.g. , from  ) are always masculine.

Nouns can sometimes vary their form to enable the derivation of differently gendered cognate nouns; for example, to produce nouns with a similar meaning but referring to someone of a different sex. Thus, in Spanish,  means "boy", and  means "girl".

In the same way, personal names are frequently constructed with affixes that identify the sex of the bearer. Common feminine suffixes used in English names are -a, of Latin or Romance origin ( Robert and Roberta); and -e, of French origin (cf. Justin and Justine).

Although gender inflection may be used to construct nouns and names for people of different sexes in languages that have grammatical gender, this alone does not constitute grammatical gender. Distinct words and names for men and women are also common in languages which do not have a grammatical gender system for nouns in general. English, for example, has feminine suffixes such as -ess (as in waitress), and also distinguishes male and female personal names, as in the above examples.

Differentiation of personal names 

Given names are proper nouns and they follow the same gender grammatical rules as common nouns. In most Indo-European languages female grammatical gender is created using an "a" or an "e" ending.

Romance languages preserved this characteristic. For example, in Spanish, approximately 89% of nouns that end in -a or -á are classified as feminine; the same is true for 98% of given names with the -a ending.

In the Germanic languages the female names have been Latinized by adding -e and -a: Brunhild, Kriemhild and Hroswith became Brunhilde, Kriemhilde and Hroswitha.
Slavic feminine given names: Olga (Russian), Małgorzata (Polish), Tetiana (Ukrainian), Oksana (Belarusian), Eliška (Czech), Bronislava (Slovak), Milica (Serbian), Darina (Bulgarian), Lucja (Croatian), Lamija (Bosnian) and Zala (Slovenian).

Differentiation of nouns with human referents 
In some languages, nouns with human references have two forms, a male and a female one. This includes not only proper names, but also names for occupations and nationalities. Examples include:

 English proper names:
 male: Andrew
 female: Andrea
 neuter: Chris for both male and female
 English occupation names
 male: waiter
 female: waitress
 neuter: doctor for both male and female
 Greek proper names  and 
 Greek occupation names  "actor" for both male and female in Greek and  "doctor" for both, but with informal female variants  and 
 Greek nationality names have five possibilities for 'English'.
 male: 
 female: 
 masculine: 
 feminine: 
 neuter: 

To complicate matters, Greek often offers additional informal versions of these. The formal forms come from the name  "England", while the less formal are derived from Italian .

Meaning-based semantic criteria
In some languages, gender is determined by strictly semantic criteria, but in other languages, semantic criteria only partially determine gender.

Strict semantic criteria

In some languages, the gender of a noun is directly determined by its physical attributes (sex, animacy, etc.), and there are few or no exceptions to this rule. There are relatively few such languages. The Dravidian languages use this system as described below.

Another example is the Dizi language, which has two asymmetrical genders. The feminine includes all living beings of female sex (e.g. woman, girl, cow...) and diminutives; the masculine encompasses all other nouns (e.g. man, boy, pot, broom...). In this language, feminine nouns are always marked with -e or -in.

Another African language, Defaka, has three genders: one for all male humans, one for all female humans, and a third for all the remaining nouns. Gender is only marked in personal pronouns. Standard English pronouns (see below) are very similar in this respect, although the English gendered pronouns (he, she) are used for domestic animals if the sex of the animal is known, and sometimes for certain objects such as ships, e.g. "What happened to the Titanic? She (or it) sank."

Mostly semantic criteria 
In some languages, the gender of nouns can mostly be determined by physical (semantic) attributes, although there remain some nouns whose gender is not assigned in this way (Corbett calls this "semantic residue"). The world view (e.g. mythology) of the speakers may influence the division of categories.

 Zande has four genders: male human, female human, animal, and inanimate. However, there are about 80 nouns representing inanimate entities which are nonetheless animate in gender: heavenly objects (moon, rainbow), metal objects (hammer, ring), edible plants (sweet potato, pea), and non-metallic objects (whistle, ball). Many have a round shape or can be explained by the role they play in mythology.
 Ket has three genders (masculine, feminine, and neuter), and most gender assignment is based on semantics, but there are many inanimate nouns outside the neuter class. Masculine nouns include male animates, most fish, trees, the moon, large wooden objects, most living beings and some religious items. Feminine nouns include female animates, three types of fish, some plants, the sun and other heavenly objects, some body parts and skin diseases, the soul, and some religious items. Words for part of a whole, as well as most other nouns that do not fall into any of the aforementioned classes, are neuter. The gender assignment of non-sex-differentiable things is complex. In general, those of no importance to the Kets are feminine, whereas objects of importance (e.g. fish, wood) are masculine. Mythology is again a significant factor.
 Alamblak has two genders, masculine and feminine. However, the masculine also includes things which are tall or long and slender, or narrow (e.g. fish, snakes, arrows and slender trees), whereas the feminine gender has things which are short, squat or wide (e.g. turtles, houses, shields and squat trees).
 In French, the distinction between the gender of a noun and the gender of the object it refers to is clear when nouns of different genders can be used for the same object, for example vélo (m.) = bicyclette (f.).

Contextual determination of gender 
There are certain situations where the assignment of gender to a noun, pronoun or noun phrase may not be straightforward. This includes in particular:
 groups of mixed gender;
 references to people or things of unknown or unspecified gender.

In languages with masculine and feminine gender, the masculine is usually employed by default to refer to persons of unknown gender and to groups of people of mixed gender. Thus, in French the feminine plural pronoun  always designates an all-female group of people (or stands for a group of nouns all of feminine gender), but the masculine equivalent  may refer to a group of males or masculine nouns, to a mixed group, or to a group of people of unknown genders. In such cases, one says that the feminine gender is semantically marked, whereas the masculine gender is unmarked.

In English, the problem of gender determination does not arise in the plural, because gender in that language is reflected only in pronouns, and the plural pronoun they does not have gendered forms. In the singular, however, the issue frequently arises when a person of unspecified or unknown gender is being referred to. In this case it has been traditional to use the masculine (he), but other solutions are now often preferred—see Gender-neutral language and Singular they.

In languages with a neuter gender, such as Slavic and Germanic languages, the neuter is often used for indeterminate gender reference, particularly when the things referred to are not people. In some cases this may even apply when referring to people, particularly children. For example, in English, one may use it to refer to a child, particularly when speaking generically rather than about a particular child of known sex.

In Icelandic (which preserves a masculine–feminine–neuter distinction in both singular and plural), the neuter plural can be used for groups of people of mixed gender, when specific people are meant. For example:
  'They (n.pl) had met in the forest when the old woman (f.sg) was a young girl and the emperor (m.sg) was only a prince.'
However, when referring to previously unmentioned groups of people or when referring to people in a generic way, especially when using an indefinite pronoun like 'some' or 'all', the masculine plural is used. For example:
  'Some people have the habit of talking to themselves.'
An example contrasting the two ways to refer to groups is the following, taken from advertisements of Christian congregations announcing their meetings:
  'All welcome' is understood to be more general whereas  is more specific and emphasises the individuality of the group members.
That the masculine is seen in Icelandic as the most generic or 'unmarked' of the three genders can also be seen in the fact that the nouns for most professions are masculine. Even feminine job descriptions historically filled by women, like  'nurse' and  'nursery school teacher' (both f.sg), have been replaced with masculine ones as men have started becoming more represented in these professions:  'nurse' and  'nursery school teacher' (both m.sg).

In spite of this, the third-person singular masculine pronoun  would normally be the default for a person of unknown gender, although in practice the indefinite pronoun  and the reflexive  or its possessive forms  usually make this unnecessary.

In Polish, where a gender-like distinction is made in the plural between "masculine personal" and all other cases (see below), a group is treated as masculine personal if it contains at least one male person.

In languages which preserve a three-way gender division in the plural, the rules for determining the gender (and sometimes number) of a coordinated noun phrase ("... and ...") may be quite complex. Czech is an example of such a language, with a division (in the plural) between masculine animate, masculine inanimate, feminine, and neuter.

Arbitrary conventional criteria 
In some languages, any gender markers have been so eroded over time (possibly through deflexion) that they are no longer recognizable. Many German nouns, for example, do not indicate their gender through either meaning or form. In such cases a noun's gender must simply be memorized, and gender can be regarded as an integral part of each noun when considered as an entry in the speaker's lexicon. (This is reflected in dictionaries, which typically indicate the gender of noun headwords where applicable.)

Gender shifts 
It is possible for a noun to have more than one gender. Such gender shifts are sometimes correlated with meaning shifts, and sometimes yield doublets with no difference in meaning. Moreover, gender shifts sometimes crosscuts number contrasts, such that the singular form of a noun has one gender, and plural form of the noun has a different gender.

Some gender shifts are meaningful 
It may also correspond to some other difference in the meaning of the word. For example, the German word  meaning "lake" is masculine, whereas the identical word meaning "sea" is feminine. The meanings of the Norwegian noun  have diverged further: masculine  is "a thing", whereas neuter  is "an assembly".

It is a matter of analysis how to draw the line between a single polysemous word with multiple genders and a set of homonyms with one gender each. For example, Bulgarian has a pair of homonyms  which are etymologically unrelated. One is masculine and means "finger"; the other is feminine and means "soil".

Some gender shifts are meaningless 
In other cases, a word may be usable in multiple genders indifferently. For example, in Bulgarian the word , ("wilderness") may be either masculine (definite form) or feminine (definite form) without any change in meaning and no preference in usage.
In Norwegian, many nouns can be either feminine or masculine according to the dialect, level of formality or whim of the speaker/writer. Even the two written forms of the language have many nouns whose gender is optional. Choosing the masculine gender will often seem more formal than using the feminine. This might be because before the creation of Norwegian Nynorsk and Norwegian Bokmål in the late 19th century, Norwegians wrote in Danish, which has lost the feminine gender, thus usage of the masculine gender (corresponding exactly to Danish common gender in conjugation in Norwegian Bokmål) is more formal sounding to modern Norwegians.

The word for "sun" can be another example. One might decline it masculine: , or feminine: , in Norwegian Bokmål. The same goes for a lot of common words like  (book),  (doll),  (bucket) and so forth. Many of the words where it is possible to choose gender are inanimate objects that one might suspect would be conjugated with the neuter gender. Nouns conjugated with the neuter gender cannot normally be conjugated as feminine or masculine in Norwegian. There is also a slight tendency towards using the masculine indefinite article even when choosing the feminine conjugation of a noun in many eastern Norwegian dialects. For instance, word for "girl" is declined: .

Some gender shifts are associated with number contrasts
These anomalies may have a historical explanation ( used to be feminine in the singular too) or result from slightly different notions ( in the singular is usually a barrel organ, whereas the plural  usually refers to the collection of columns in a church organ). In other cases, the anomaly can be explained by the form of the noun, as is the case in Scottish Gaelic. Masculine nouns which form their plural by palatalization of their final consonant can change gender in their plural form, as a palatalized final consonant is often a marker of a feminine noun, e.g. ("small boy"), but  ("small boys"), with the adjective showing agreement for both feminine gender (lenition of initial consonant) and plural number (suffixed ).

Gender across languages 

Related languages need not assign the same gender to a noun: this shows that gender can vary across related languages. Conversely, unrelated languages that are in contact can impact how a borrowed noun is assigned gender, with either the borrowing or the donor language determining the gender of the borrowed word.

Gender can vary across related languages 
Nouns which have the same meanings in different languages need not have the same gender. This is particularly so in the case of things with no natural gender, such as sexless objects. For example, there is, by all appearances, nothing about a table that should cause it to be associated with any particular gender, and different languages' words for "table" are found to have various genders: feminine, as with the French ; masculine, as with German ; or neuter, as with Norwegian .

Cognate nouns in closely related languages are likely to have the same gender, because they tend to inherit the gender of the original word in the parent language. For instance, in the Romance languages, the words for "sun" are masculine, being derived from the Latin masculine noun , whereas the words for "moon" are feminine, being derived from the Latin feminine . (This contrasts with the genders found in German, where  "sun" is feminine, and  "moon" is masculine, as well as in other Germanic languages.) However, there are exceptions to this principle. For instance,  ("milk") is masculine in Italian (as are French  and Portuguese ), whereas Spanish  is feminine and Romanian  is neuter. Likewise, the word for "boat" is neuter in German, but common gender in Swedish.

Some more examples of the above phenomena are given below. (These come mostly from the Slavic languages, where gender largely correlates with the noun ending.)
 The Russian word  ("moon") is feminine, whereas  ("crescent moon", also meaning "month") is masculine.
 In Polish the loanword  ("tram") is masculine, whereas the cognate loanword in Czech, is feminine. In Romanian,  is neuter.
 The Polish word  ("thousand") is masculine, whereas the cognate in Russian, тысяча, is feminine, while the Icelandic cognate  is neuter.
 The French word  ("team") is feminine, while the Spanish word  is masculine. The Spanish form contrasts with European Portuguese  and Brazilian Portuguese , both of which are feminine.
 The Italian word  ("ape") is feminine, whereas the Spanish word  is masculine.
 The French word  is feminine, but the Spanish cognate  is generally masculine (except in some poetic contexts and among sea workers), whereas the Catalan cognate  can be masculine or feminine, depending on the dialect. All these words mean "sea" and are descended from the Latin , which was neuter.

How languages assign gender to borrowed words 
Borrowed words are assigned gender in one of two ways:
 via criteria determined by the borrowing language;
 via criteria determined by the donor language.

Borrowing language can determine gender 
Ibrahim identifies several processes by which a language assigns a gender to a newly borrowed word; these processes follow patterns by which even children, through their subconscious recognition of patterns, can often correctly predict a noun's gender.
 If the noun is animate, natural gender tends to dictate grammatical gender.
 The borrowed word tends to take the gender of the native word it replaces. According to Ghil'ad Zuckermann, morphemic adaptations of English words into American Italian or British Italian are abundant with such cases. For example, the feminine gender of the British Italian word  "bag" was induced by the feminine gender of the Italian word  "bag".
 If the borrowed word happens to have a suffix that the borrowing language uses as a gender marker, the suffix tends to dictate gender.
 If the borrowed word rhymes with one or more native words, the latter tend to dictate gender.
 The default assignment is the borrowing language's unmarked gender.
 Rarely, the word retains the gender it had in the donor language. This tends to happen more frequently in more formal language such as scientific terms, where some knowledge of the donor language can be expected.

Sometimes the gender of a word switches with time. For example, the Russian modern loanword  "whisky" was originally feminine, then masculine, and today it has become neuter.

Donor language can determine gender 
Ghil'ad Zuckermann argues that the cross-lingual retention of grammatical gender can change not only the lexis of the target language but also its morphology.

The result of this neologism might have been, more generally, the strengthening of Israeli  as a productive feminine locative suffix (combined with the influence of Polish  and Russian ).

Distribution of gender in the world's languages 

Grammatical gender is a common phenomenon in the world's languages. A typological survey of 174 languages revealed that over one fourth of them had grammatical gender. Gender systems rarely overlap with numerical classifier systems. Gender and noun class systems are usually found in fusional or agglutinating languages, whereas classifiers are more typical of isolating languages. Thus, according to Johanna Nichols, these characteristics correlate positively with the presence of grammatical gender in the world's languages:
 location in an area with languages featuring noun classes;
 preference for head-marking morphology;
 moderate to high morphological complexity;
 non-accusative alignment.

Grammatical gender is found in many Indo-European languages (including Spanish, French, Russian, and German—but not English, Bengali, Armenian or Persian, for example), Afroasiatic languages (which includes the Semitic and Berber languages, etc.), and in other language families such as Dravidian and Northeast Caucasian, as well as several Australian Aboriginal languages such as Dyirbal, and Kalaw Lagaw Ya. Most Niger–Congo languages also have extensive systems of noun classes, which can be grouped into several grammatical genders.

Conversely, grammatical gender is usually absent from the Koreanic, Japonic, Tungusic, Turkic, Mongolic, Austronesian, Sino-Tibetan, Uralic and most Native American language families.

Modern English makes use of gender in pronouns, which are generally marked for natural gender, but lacks a system of gender concord within the noun phrase which is one of the central elements of grammatical gender in most other Indo-European languages.

Indo-European 
Many Indo-European languages, but not English, provide examples of grammatical gender.

Research indicates that the earliest stages of Proto-Indo-European had two genders (animate and inanimate), as did Hittite, the earliest attested Indo-European language. The classification of nouns based on animacy and inanimacy and the lack of gender are today characteristic of Armenian. According to the theory, the animate gender, which (unlike the inanimate) had independent vocative and accusative forms, later split into masculine and feminine, thus originating the three-way classification into masculine, feminine and neuter.

Many Indo-European languages retained the three genders, including most Slavic languages, Latin, Sanskrit, Ancient and Modern Greek, German, Icelandic, Romanian and Asturian (two Romance language exceptions). In them, there is a high but not absolute correlation between grammatical gender and declensional class. Many linguists believe that to be true of the middle and late stages of Proto-Indo-European.

However, many languages reduced the number of genders to two. Some lost the neuter, leaving masculine and feminine like most Romance languages (see . A few traces of the neuter remain, such as the distinct Spanish pronoun  and Italian nouns with so-called "mobile gender"), as well as Hindustani and the Celtic languages. Others merged feminine and masculine into a common gender but retained the neuter, as in Swedish and Danish (and, to some extent, Dutch; see Gender in Danish and Swedish and Gender in Dutch grammar).

On the other hand, some Slavic languages can be argued to have added new genders to the classical three (see below).

Germanic: English 

Although grammatical gender was a fully productive inflectional category in Old English, Modern English has a much less pervasive gender system, primarily based on natural gender and reflected essentially in pronouns only.

There are a few traces of gender marking in Modern English:
 Some words take different derived forms depending on the natural gender of the referent, such as waiter/waitress and widow/widower.
 The third-person singular personal pronouns (and their possessive forms) are gender specific: he/him/his (masculine gender, used for men, boys, and male animals), she/her(s) (feminine gender, for women, girls, and female animals), the singular they/them/their(s) (common gender, used for people or animals of unknown, irrelevant, or non-binary gender), and it/its (neuter gender, mainly for objects, abstractions and animals). (There are also distinct personal and non-personal forms but no differentiation by natural gender in the case of certain interrogative and relative pronouns: who/whom for persons, corresponding to he, she, and the singular they; and which corresponding to it.)

However, these are relatively insignificant features compared with a typical language with full grammatical gender. English nouns are not generally considered to belong to gender classes in the way that French, German or Russian nouns are. There is no gender agreement in English between nouns and their modifiers (articles, other determiners, or adjectives, with the occasional exception such as blond/blonde, a spelling convention borrowed from French). Gender agreement applies in effect only to pronouns, and the choice of pronoun is determined based on semantics (perceived qualities of the thing being referred to) rather than on any conventional assignment of particular nouns to particular genders.

Only a relatively small number of English nouns have distinct male and female forms; many of them are loanwords from non-Germanic languages (the suffixes -rix and -ress in words such as aviatrix and waitress, for instance, derive directly or indirectly from Latin). English has no live productive gender markers. An example of such a marker might be the suffix -ette (of French provenance), but this is seldom used today, surviving mostly in either historical contexts or with disparaging or humorous intent.

The gender of an English pronoun typically coincides with the natural gender of its referent, rather than with the grammatical gender of its antecedent. The choice between she, he, they, and it comes down to whether the pronoun is intended to designate a woman, a man, or someone or something else. There are certain exceptions, however:
 With animals, it is usually used, but when the sex of the animal is known, it may be referred to as he or she (particularly when expressing an emotional connection with the animal, as with a pet).
 Certain nonhuman things can be referred to with the pronoun she (her, hers), particularly countries and ships, and sometimes other vehicles or machines. See . This usage is considered a metaphorical figure of speech; it is also in decline, and advised against by most journalistic style guides.

In the past and to some degree still in the present, the masculine has been used as the "default" gender in English. The use of the plural pronoun they with singular reference is common in practice. The neuter it may be used for a baby but not normally for an older child or adult. (Other genderless pronouns exist, such as the impersonal pronoun one, but they are not generally substitutable for a personal pronoun.) For more information see Gender-neutral language and Singular they.

Slavic languages 
The Slavic languages mostly continue the Proto-Indo-European system of three genders, masculine, feminine and neuter. However, some of the languages, including Russian, Czech, Slovak and Polish, also make certain additional grammatical distinctions between animate and inanimate nouns: Polish in the plural, and Russian in the accusative case, differentiate between human and non-human nouns.

In Russian, the different treatment of animate nouns involves their accusative case (and that of adjectives qualifying them) being formed identically to the genitive rather than to the nominative. In the singular that applies to masculine nouns only, but in the plural it applies in all genders. See Russian declension.

A similar system applies in Czech, but the situation is somewhat different in the plural: Only masculine nouns are affected, and the distinctive feature is a distinct inflective ending for masculine animate nouns in the nominative plural and for adjectives and verbs agreeing with those nouns. See Czech declension.

Polish might be said to distinguish five genders: personal masculine (referring to male humans), animate non-personal masculine, inanimate masculine, feminine, and neuter. The animate–inanimate opposition for the masculine gender applies in the singular, and the personal–impersonal opposition, which classes animals along with inanimate objects, applies in the plural. (A few nouns denoting inanimate things are treated grammatically as animate and vice versa.) The manifestations of the differences are as follows:
 In the singular, masculine animates (in the standard declension) have an accusative form identical to the genitive, and masculine inanimates have accusative identical to the nominative. The same applies to adjectives qualifying these nouns, the same as in Russian and Czech.
animate:  ("good customer"; nominative);  (accusative and genitive)
animate:  ("good dog"; nominative);  (accusative and genitive)
inanimate:  ("good cheese"; nominative and accusative);  (genitive only)
 In the plural, masculine personal nouns (but not other animate nouns) take accusatives that are identical to the genitives; they also typically take different endings in the nominative (e.g.  rather than ). Such endings also appear on adjectives and past tense verbs. The two features are analogous to features of Russian and Czech respectively, except that those languages make an animate/inanimate distinction rather than personal/impersonal) . Examples of the Polish system:
personal:  ("good customers"; nominative);  (accusative and genitive)
impersonal:  ("good dogs"; nominative and accusative);  (genitive only)
impersonal:  ("good cheeses"; nominative and accusative);  (genitive only)

A few nouns have both personal and impersonal forms, depending on meaning (for example,  may behave as an impersonal noun when it refers to a client in the computing sense). For more information on the above inflection patterns, see Polish morphology.

Dravidian 
In the Dravidian languages, nouns are classified primarily on the basis of their semantic properties. The highest-level classification of nouns is often described as being between "rational" and "nonrational". Nouns representing humans and deities are considered rational, and other nouns (those representing animals and objects) are treated as nonrational. Within the rational class there are further subdivisions into masculine, feminine and collective nouns. For further information, see Tamil grammar.

Austronesian 
In the Austronesian Wuvulu-Aua language, vocative words used when addressing a relative often specify the speaker's gender. For example,  means 'sister of female',  means opposite-gender sibling, and  means female's father's sister or female's brother's daughter.

See also 
 Gender-neutral language
 Gender neutrality in genderless languages
 Gender neutrality in languages with grammatical gender
 Gender-neutral language in English
 Gender-specific job title
 Generic antecedents
 Grammatical conjugation
 Polarity of gender

Notes

References

Bibliography 
 
 Craig, Colette G. (1986). Noun classes and categorization: Proceedings of a symposium on categorization and noun classification, Eugene, Oregon, October 1983. Amsterdam: J. Benjamins.
 
 
 
 Greenberg, J. H. (1978) "How does a language acquire gender markers?" In J. H. Greenberg et al. (eds.) Universals of Human Language, Vol. 4, pp. 47–82.
 Hockett, Charles F. (1958) A Course in Modern Linguistics, Macmillan.
 
 Iturrioz, J. L. (1986) "Structure, meaning and function: a functional analysis of gender and other classificatory techniques". Función 1. 1–3.
 Mercier, Adele (2002) "L'homme et la factrice: sur la logique du genre en français". "Dialogue", Volume 41, Issue 3, 2002
 Pinker, Steven (1994) The Language Instinct, William Morrow and Company.
 Di Garbo F, Olsson B, Wälchli B (eds.). 2019. Grammatical gender and linguistic complexity I: General issues and specific studies. Berlin: Language Science Press. . . Open Access. http://langsci-press.org/catalog/book/223
 Di Garbo F, Olsson B, Wälchli B (eds.). 2019. Grammatical gender and linguistic complexity II: World-wide comparative studies. Berlin: Language Science Press.  . Open Access. http://langsci-press.org/catalog/book/237

External links 
 An overview of the grammar of Old English at ucalgary.ca
 
 
 doi: Grammatical Features Inventory at Surrey Morphology Group
 The Exceptions: European Male Names Ending in A at NamepediA Blog

 
Linguistic morphology